Sitkum is an unincorporated community in Coos County, Oregon, United States. It is about 27 miles north of Remote in the Southern Oregon Coast Range near the East Fork Coquille River. Sitkum is served by the Myrtle Point post office.

A tavern or roadhouse was established as a stagecoach stop near a point halfway between Roseburg and Coos City on the Coos Bay Wagon Road about 1872 or 1873. A competitor put up another halfway house nearby and the name Sitkum, a Chinook Jargon word for "half", was selected for the place. Sitkum post office took its name from the tavern. It ran from 1873 to 1964, with one intermission. The Halfway House at Sitkum was a combination restaurant, tavern, rooming house, post office and telegraph station where travelers stopped while horses were changed. There is little left of the community today, and the Sitkum School was converted into a residence. The former teacher's house and the gym still exist on the grounds.

Google Maps cartographic team did not bother to record the town, and the site's map "pin" locates the town center out in a pasture.

References

External links
Historic image of Civilian Conservation Corps camp in Sitkum from the Oregon State University Archives

Unincorporated communities in Coos County, Oregon
Civilian Conservation Corps in Oregon
1873 establishments in Oregon
Populated places established in 1873
Unincorporated communities in Oregon